Cazadero and San Pablo Railroad was a ,  narrow gauge line built in 1896 as the Ferrocarril Cazadero La Torre y Tepetongo from an interchange with the Mexican Central Railroad (Ferrocarril Central Mexicano -- Ferrocarriles Nacionales de México after 1909) at Cazadero La Torre southwest through Nado to the sawmill community of San Pablo in Estado de México.  Passenger service began to Nado in 1897.  The line was reorganized as the Ferrocarril Cazadero y Solis in 1906.  Lumbering and railroad operations were suspended during the Mexican Revolution; but the line resumed operations in 1922 as the Ferrocarril Cazadero y San Pablo.  of logging branches were constructed around San Pablo.  The forests were completely harvested, and operations ceased after World War II.  Three locomotives surviving the revolution were sold to sugar plantations, but rails remained in place for another decade.

Locomotives

References 

 
 

Defunct railway companies of Mexico
2 ft gauge railways in Mexico
Ferrocarriles Nacionales de México
Railway lines opened in 1900
Railway companies established in 1896